The Director of National Service was a post that existed briefly in the British government. Although a political appointment, the initial holder was Neville Chamberlain who was not a Member of Parliament at the time. Chamberlain resigned in August 1917 when the War Cabinet decided to change the organisation of recruiting from the control of the War Office to the Directorate of National Service, a change which he disapproved.

Directors of National Service 1916–1919

Neville Chamberlain (19 December 1916 – 8 August 1917) (resigned)
Sir Auckland Geddes (17 August 1917 – 19 December 1919)

See also 
 Conscription in the United Kingdom
 Rise of Neville Chamberlain#Director of National Service

National Service
1916 establishments in the United Kingdom
1919 disestablishments
1910s in the United Kingdom
Defunct ministerial offices in the United Kingdom